Coteau Holmes is an unincorporated community in St. Martin Parish, in the U.S. state of Louisiana. LA 679 passes through the community. The nearest major town is Loreauville. It is part of the Lafayette Metropolitan Statistical Area. Matthew Broussard is mayor of the city, and Robert "Blue" Broussard is sheriff.

Notes

Unincorporated communities in St. Martin Parish, Louisiana
Unincorporated communities in Louisiana
Lafayette metropolitan area, Louisiana